James Sabulei (born 12 April 1969) is a Kenyan former triple jumper who competed in the 1992 Summer Olympics.

References

1969 births
Living people
Kenyan male triple jumpers
Olympic athletes of Kenya
Athletes (track and field) at the 1990 Commonwealth Games
Athletes (track and field) at the 1992 Summer Olympics
African Games gold medalists for Kenya
African Games medalists in athletics (track and field)
Athletes (track and field) at the 1991 All-Africa Games
Commonwealth Games competitors for Kenya